Tekeli is a village in the Çemişgezek District, Tunceli Province, Turkey. The village is populated by Kurds of the Qoçan tribe and had a population of 144 in 2021.

References 

Kurdish settlements in Tunceli Province
Villages in Çemişgezek District